Boyer is a French surname. In rarer cases, it can be a corruption or deliberate alteration of other names.

Origins and statistics 
Boyer is found traditionally along the Mediterranean (Provence, Languedoc), the Rhône valley, Auvergne,  Limousin, Périgord and more generally in the Southwest of France. It is also found in the north of the country. There are two variant spellings: Boyé (southwest) and Bouyer (Loire-Atlantique, Charente-Maritime).

, Boyer ranks 55th in the most common surnames in France. For the period 1891–1990 it ranked 34th.

Like many other surnames, it used to be a nickname describing somebody's job: "bullock driver", "cowherd", that is to say Bouvier in common French. It derives mainly from the Occitan buòu "ox", with the suffix -iar / -ier, frenchified phonetically or, further north, sometimes from a variant form in dialectal French bô, bou "ox" corresponding to common French bœuf with the suffix -ier. In French, the modern spelling -oyer  avoids confusion between -oi-er  and -oier .

In rarer cases, it can be a corruption or deliberate alteration of several other names :
 In England, it may come from bowyer, meaning "bow maker" or "bow seller."
 In Turkish, the name may come from "boy-er", "boy" meaning "size" or "stature" and "er" meaning "man" or "soldier."
 It can also be a corruption or deliberate alteration of German names like Bayer or Bauer.

People with the surname

Abel Boyer (1667–1729), French-English lexicographer and journalist
Alexis de Boyer (1757–1833), French surgeon
Andre Boyer (disambiguation), several people
Angélique Boyer (born 1988), French-Mexican actress
Anita Boyer (1915–1985), American Big Band singer and songwriter
Anise Boyer (1914–2008), American dancer and actress
Anne Boyer (born 1973), American poet and essayist
Antide Boyer (1850-1918), French manual worker, Provençal dialect writer and journalist
Auguste Boyer (1896-1956), French professional golfer prominent on the European circuit
Benjamin Markley Boyer (1823-1887), Democratic member of the U.S. House of Representatives
Bert Boyer, director of the Centre of Alaska Native Health Research
Bill Boyer, American sports team owner
Bill Boyer Jr., American entrepreneur, owner of Mokulele Airlines
Blaine Boyer (born 1981), American baseball player
Blair Boyer (born 1981), Australian politician
Boni Boyer (1958–1996), American vocalist, multi-instrumentalist and composer
Carl Benjamin Boyer (1906–1976), American historian of mathematics
Charles Boyer (1899–1978), French-American actor
Charles-Georges Boyer (1743–1806 or 1807), French music publisher
Charles P. Boyer (born 1942), American mathematician
Christine Boyer (1771-1800), first wife of Lucien Bonaparte
Claude Boyer (1618-1698), French clergyman, playwright, apologist and poet
Claudette Boyer (1938–2013), Canadian politician
Clete Boyer (1937–2007), American baseball player
Denise Boyer-Merdich (born 1962), American soccer player and a part of United States women's national team
Derek Boyer (born 1969), Fijian-Australian world champion powerlifter
Edie Boyer (born 1966), American discus thrower
Elizabeth H. Boyer (born 1952), American fantasy author
Elizabeth M. Boyer (1913–2002), American lawyer, feminist founder of Women's Equity Action League (WEAL), and writer
Éric Boyer (born 1963), French professional road bicycle racer
Ernest L. Boyer (1928-1995), American educator
François Boyer (1920-2003), French screenwriter
G. Bruce Boyer (born 1941), Journalist
George Boyer (born 1954), Professor of Labor Economics in the School of Industrial and Labor Relations at Cornell University
Gilles Boyer (born 1971), French politician of the Horizons party and elected Member of the European Parliament
Glenn Boyer (1924–2013), American writer
Greg Boyer (disambiguation), several people
Herbert Boyer (born 1936), American biochemist and businessman
India Boyer (1907–1998), American architect
Isabella Eugénie Boyer (1841-1904), French-American model and heiress
Jacques Boyer (born 1955), American cyclist and child molester
Jacqueline Boyer (born 1941), French singer
Jean Boyer (director) (1901–1965), French director and author
Jean Boyer (politician) (born 1937), French politician
Jean-Pierre Boyer (1776–1843), Haitian President and emancipator of slaves in Santo Domingo
Jean-Pierre Boyer (cardinal) (1829–1896), French prelate of the Catholic Church, also the Bishop of Clermont and Archbishop of Bourges
Jim Boyer (disambiguation), several people
John W. Boyer (1890-1924), race car driver and co-winner of the 1924 Indianapolis 500.
John W. Boyer (born 1946),  American historian and academic administrator
Joseph Boyer (1848–1930), a Canadian-American inventor and computer industrialist
Josh Boyer (born 1977), American football coach
Julien Boyer (born 1988), French professional footballer who plays as a left-back
Katherine Boyer, Canadian Métis artist
Katy Boyer, American actress
Ken Boyer (1931–1982), American baseball player
LaNada Boyer (born 1947), Native American writer and activist
Lewis L. Boyer (1886-1944), American politician and U.S. Representative of Illinois
Lisa Boyer (born nd.), College Basketball Coach
Louis Boyer (disambiguation), several people
Lucien Boyer (1876-1942), French music hall singer
Lucienne Boyer (1901–1983), French singer
Mark Boyer (born 1960), retired American football tight end
Mark A. Boyer (born 1961), Board of Trustees Distinguished Professor in the Department of Geography at the University of Connecticut and a specialist in international relations theory
Marius Boyer (1885–1947), French architect and professor
Marine Boyer (born 2000), French female artistic gymnast
Max Boyer (born 1984), Canadian professional wrestler
Merle Boyer (1920–2009), American jewelry designer
Michael Boyer (born 1960), American actor and showman
Miguel Boyer (1939–2014), Spanish politician
Mitch Boyer (1837–1876), Old West guide and interpreter of Sioux and French Canadian descent
Myriam Boyer (born 1948), French film and television actress
Nate Boyer (born 1981), United States Army Green Beret and actor
Nikki Boyer (born 1975), American actress and singer-songwriter
Otto Boyer (1874–1912), German genre painter and writer
Pascal Boyer, French-American anthropologist
Patrick Boyer (born 1945), Canadian politician
Paul Boyer (disambiguation), several people
Peter Boyer (born 1970), American composer
Phil Boyer (born 1949), English footballer
Pierre François Xavier Boyer (1772–1851), French general of the Napoleonic Wars and Algerian invasion
Régis Boyer (1932–2017), French scholar
Richard Boyer (disambiguation), several people
Rick Boyer (1943–2021), American author and university professor
Robert Stephen Boyer, American professor of computer science, mathematics, and philosophy at The University of Texas at Austin
Robert Hamilton Boyer (1932-1966), a visiting professor shot and killed in Charles Whitman's shooting spree at The University of Texas at Austin in 1966, known for the Boyer–Lindquist coordinates
Robert Boyer (artist) (1948–2004), Canadian artist of aboriginal heritage
Scott Boyer (1947–2018), American musician
Sally Boyer, American gambler
Stéphen Boyer (born 1996), French volleyball player
Stéphane Boyer (born 1988), Canadian politician and  mayor of Laval, Quebec
Valérie Boyer (born 1962), French politician and Senator for Bouches-du-Rhône
Yves Boyer (born 1965), French luger who competed in the men's singles and doubles events at the 1992 Winter Olympics
Yvonne Boyer (born 1953), first indigenous person from Ontario appointed to the Senate of Canada
Zac Boyer (born 1971), National Hockey League right winger

See also 
 Boyar (surname)
 Bauer (disambiguation)

Notes

Occitan-language surnames